This is a list of the television stations, radio stations, magazines and newspapers in Moncton, New Brunswick.

Television stations

Radio stations

Major radio broadcasting companies in the Greater Moncton area.
 CBC/Radio-Canada 
 Maritime Broadcasting System
 Stingray Radio
 Acadia Broadcasting

Internet Radio
plusfm.ca

Defunct AM radio stations 
 CKCW-AM 1220 kHz (1370 kHz - 1934 to 1941) (1400 kHz - 1941 to 1946) (1220 kHz - 1946 to 2001)
AM signal signed off on April 11, 2001, having moved to 94.5 FM as CKCW-FM.
 CBA-AM 1070 kHz (1050 kHz - 1939 to 1941) (1070 kHz - 1941 to 2008)
CBC FM transmitter signed on in January 2008 and the call sign was changed to CBAM-FM. 
The 50,000-watt clear-channel station outlet for the Maritimes was the last AM station in eastern New Brunswick (signed off in April 2008). Its transmitter site was on Dover Road in Dieppe. 
 CBAF-AM 1300 kHz (1954–1988)
AM transmitter was discontinued in 1988 and after eight years of simulcasting the FM transmitter, it became the station's primary frequency. Its former AM transmitter was located on Amirault Street, Dieppe.
 CHLR-AM 1380 kHz (1981–1985)
French-language radio station which had an effective radiated power of 10,000 watts. Studios located in the former CKCW AM premises at the lobby of the Assomption Place from 1981 to 1985.

Magazines

Monthly 
Best Version Media (Moncton) - distributed throughout the Moncton North and Irishtown / Tankville neighbourhoods; anglophone

Newspapers

Dailies 
L'Acadie Nouvelle - francophone
Telegraph-Journal (Saint John) - distributed throughout the province;  anglophone
Times & Transcript - anglophone

Weeklies 
L'Étoile - Édition Dieppe - francophone

References

Moncton
 
Media, Moncton